Peroxisome assembly factor 2 is a protein that in humans is encoded by the PEX6 gene. PEX6 is an AAA ATPase that localizes to the peroxisome. PEX6 forms a hexamer with PEX1 and is recruited to the membrane by PEX26.

Function 
From yeast to plants to humans, there is only one verified function of PEX6; PEX6 (and PEX1) removes PEX5 from the peroxisomal membrane so that PEX5 may do additional rounds of peroxisomal import. Human PEX6 can genetically complement plant pex6 mutants, which highlights functional conservation. Work with pex6 mutants in Arabidopsis thaliana has shown that PEX6 may have a role in consuming oil body (plant-specific lipid droplets). Work with yeast pex6 mutants has shown that PEX6 is a key player in the autophagy of peroxisomes called pexophagy.

Related diseases 
Mutations in the genes encoding PEX6, along with PEX1, are the leading causes of peroxisomal biogenesis disorders, such as Zellweger Syndrome spectrum, infantile Refsum disease, and neonatal adrenoleukodystrophy. These genetic diseases are autosomal recessive and occur in 1 of every 50,000 births. Because of the autosomal recessive inheritance of Zellweger Syndrome, PEX6 can usually be found in larger carrier screening gene panels.

References

Further reading

External links 
  GeneReviews/NCBI/NIH/UW entry on Peroxisome Biogenesis Disorders, Zellweger Syndrome Spectrum
 OMIM entries on Peroxisome Biogenesis Disorders, Zellweger Syndrome Spectrum